This is the discography of American rapper Rasheeda.

Albums

Studio albums

Extended plays

Compilation albums

Mixtapes

Singles

As a lead artist

As featured performer

References

Discographies of American artists
Hip hop discographies